Mädchen in Uniform (Girls in Uniform) is a 1958 French-West German drama film directed by Géza von Radványi and based on the play (credited here as "Ritter Nérestan") by Christa Winsloe. It was entered into the 8th Berlin International Film Festival. It is a remake of the 1931 film. It was shot at the Spandau Studios in Berlin. The film's sets were designed by the art director Emil Hasler and Walter Kutz.

Plot
Manuela von Meinhardis, in the care of an unfeeling aunt after her mother dies, in 1910 is sent to a boarding school at Potsdam that is run under rigid Prussian discipline by the authoritarian headmistress. The only teacher to show her sympathy is Miss von Bernburg, who disagrees with the militaristic regime at the school and encourages the girls' self-expression through the arts. All Manuela's affection is poured out on the attractive Miss von Bernburg, who says that she belongs to all the girls and cannot have favourites.

For the annual play, performed before parents and the princess who is patron of the school, Romeo and Juliet is chosen and the previously shy Manuela emerges as a forceful Romeo. Unfortunately, the cook puts rum in the punch served to the girls at the party after the play, where a drunken Manuela proclaims publicly her love for Miss von Bernburg. Telling Miss von Bernburg she must resign, the headmistress confines Manuela to the sanatorium. When Manuela learns that Miss von Bernburg is leaving, in front of the whole school she threatens to throw herself down the staircase. After Miss von Bernburg begs her not to jump, she is seized by other girls and in a state of collapse put back in the sanatorium. There the headmistress visits her and, in an unprecedented show of humanity, holds her hand while at the same time asking Miss von Bernburg to stay.

Cast
 Lilli Palmer as Fräulein Elisabeth von Bernburg
 Romy Schneider as Manuela von Meinhardis
 Therese Giehse as Headmistress
 Margaret Jahnen as Miss Evans
 Blandine Ebinger as Fräulein von Racket
 Adelheid Seeck as Princess
 Gina Albert as Marga
 Sabine Sinjen as Ilse von Westhagen
 Christine Kaufmann as Mia
 Danik Patisson as Alexandra von Treskow
 Ginette Pigeon as Edelgard von Kleist
 Marthe Mercadier as Madame Aubert

References

Notes
 Petruta Tatulescu. Gender and Identity at Boarding Schools: Outcast Teachers in "Maedchen in Uniform" (1958) vs "Loving Annabelle" (2006). In: Cinej Cinema Journal 1/2011. P. 141–147. http://cinej.pitt.edu/ojs/index.php/cinej/article/view/16/106

External links

1958 films
1958 drama films
1950s LGBT-related films
German drama films
German LGBT-related films
West German films
1950s German-language films
Films directed by Géza von Radványi
Lesbian-related films
Remakes of German films
Films about educators
German films based on plays
1950s high school films
Films set in boarding schools
Films set in 1910
Films featuring an all-female cast
1950s teen films
French drama films
Films shot at Spandau Studios
1950s French films
1950s German films